The Fryer's Delight is a fish and chip shop in the Bloomsbury district of London, United Kingdom.  It was started by Italian brothers, Giovanni and Giuseppe Ferdenzi, who came from Piacenza and worked there for many years.  It is said to be popular with London cab drivers.

The fish is the traditional choices of cod, haddock, plaice and skate.  The chips are fried to be fluffy on the inside while crisp outside.  The frying is done in traditional beef dripping, which gives the food a distinctive taste.

Reception

Sandra Gustafson, in Cheap Eats in London, described it as one of the best fish and chip shops in London and said that Joan Rivers used to eat there when she visited.  Kevin Allen, in The Hidden Agenda, described it as "the very best fish and chips in town". In 2012, The Londonist's "fish and chip detective" rated it 6/10 describing the food as average but the ambience as an "unimpeachably charming old-school atmosphere".  Bella Blissett of the Evening Standard, described it as "proper old-fashioned fish'n'chips; the kind that used to be doled out in newspaper". 

Lisa Harris and Sarah Randell, of Sainsbury's magazine rated it 8/10, "Fish is deep-fried the old fashioned way, in beef dripping, so you get a crisp, dark batter with perfectly cooked cod underneath. ... Formica tables, shared booths and an old-style menu on the wall give this place a real retro feel".

The shop appeared in the videogame The Getaway in 2002.

See also
 List of fish and chip restaurants

References 

Fish and chip restaurants
Restaurants in London
Seafood restaurants in the United Kingdom